Ian David Meadows (born 5 January 1959) is a British archaeologist. He has worked in archaeology for some 40 years, including as a Senior Project Officer at Northamptonshire Archaeology from 1992 to 2014. During that time he excavated a number of large quarries in England and Wales, and excavated the boar-crested Anglo-Saxon Pioneer Helmet in addition to discovering the first definitive evidence for viticulture in Roman Britain. He has also worked for the Museum of London Archaeology, and has taught archaeology and landscape history for Cambridge University, Anglia Ruskin University, the University of Bath, and the Workers' Educational Association.

Career

Ian David Meadows was born on 5 January 1959. He has worked in archaeology for approximately 40 years. From 1992 to 2014 he worked with Northamptonshire Archaeology as Senior Project Officer, during which time he directed many projects, particularly the excavations of large landscapes in English and Welsh quarries. Starting in about 1993 Meadows began digging in a gravel pit in Wollaston, Northamptonshire, ultimately leading to both the discovery of the first definitive evidence of viticulture from Roman Britain, and the unearthing of the Pioneer Helmet, only the fourth Anglo-Saxon helmet to be found.

In 1996, while leading a team with Tony Brown of the University of Exeter's School of Geography and Archaeology, Meadows discovered the first evidence for viticulture from Roman Britain. The find followed the excavation of a series of farms from the Iron and Roman ages, and was soon followed by the discovery of vineyards in the Nene Valley. By 1999 Meadows had found evidence of seven vineyards: four in Northamptonshire, one in Cambridgeshire, one in Lincolnshire and one in Buckinghamshire. One site alone had four miles of trenches, enough to produce about 10,000 litres of wine annually. The seven vineyards covered a combined 30 acres, suggesting to Meadows that "research may yet reveal that Britain was a major wine producer in ancient times."

The year after discovering the Roman vineyards, in 1997 Meadows discovered the Anglo-Saxon Pioneer Helmet. Also found in Wollaston, it was part of the inhumation of a high-status Anglo-Saxon man, and was found with a pattern welded sword and a hanging bowl. News of the find made newspapers as far away as Australia and New Zealand, for the helmet was only the fourth contemporaneous example to be discovered, coming after those from Benty Grange, Sutton Hoo, and York, and before two subsequent discoveries from Shorwell and Staffordshire.

As of 2016, Meadows is leading the excavations at Chester Farm, a walled Roman town with 10,000 years of history. It has evidence dating back to the Mesolithic, Iron and Medieval ages, as well as farm buildings from the 17th century.

Publications

References

Bibliography
  
 
  
  
 
 
  
 
  
  
  
  
  

British archaeologists
1959 births
Living people